Ralph Brown (born 26 February 1944) is an English former footballer who played for Aston Villa and Notts County. His only appearance for Aston Villa came in the 1961 Football League Cup Final.

References

1944 births
English footballers
Association football forwards
English Football League players
Bolton Wanderers F.C. players
Aston Villa F.C. players
Notts County F.C. players
Living people